Group E of the 2023 FIFA Women's World Cup will take place from 22 July to 1 August 2023. The group consists of the United States, Vietnam, the Netherlands and Portugal. The top two teams will advance to the round of 16.

Teams

Notes

Standings

In the round of 16:
 The winners of Group E will advance to play the runners-up of Group G.
 The runners-up of Group E will advance to play the winners of Group G.

Matches
All times listed are local, NZST (UTC+12).

United States vs Vietnam

Netherlands vs Portugal

United States vs Netherlands

Portugal vs Vietnam

Portugal vs United States

Vietnam vs Netherlands

Discipline
Fair play points will be used as tiebreakers in the group if the overall and head-to-head records of teams are tied. These are calculated based on yellow and red cards received in all group matches as follows:
first yellow card: minus 1 point;
indirect red card (second yellow card): minus 3 points;
direct red card: minus 4 points;
yellow card and direct red card: minus 5 points;

Only one of the above deductions will be applied to a player in a single match.

References

External links
 

2023 FIFA Women's World Cup